Acton Pigott is a hamlet in the English county of Shropshire. It lies just outside the village of Acton Burnell.

See also
Listed buildings in Acton Burnell

External links
 
 

Villages in Shropshire